Algirdas Ražauskas (March 22, 1952 – February 3, 2008) was a Lithuanian politician, born in Būteniai. In 1990 he was among those who signed the Act of the Re-Establishment of the State of Lithuania.

References
Biography

1952 births
2008 deaths
People from Tauragė District Municipality
Members of the Seimas
Communist Party of the Soviet Union members
Social Democratic Party of Lithuania politicians